Chryseobacterium bovis  is a Gram-negative, rod-shaped, aerobic and non-motile bacteria from the genus of Chryseobacterium which has been isolated from raw cow milk in Israel.

References

Further reading

External links
Type strain of Chryseobacterium bovis at BacDive -  the Bacterial Diversity Metadatabase

bovis
Bacteria described in 2008